The Telkom Knockout was a South African professional football knockout competition which comprised the 16 teams in the South African Premier Soccer League.

The competition was established in 1982 and was first known as the Datsun Challenge. Under the new NSL regime in 1984, it became known as the JPS Knockout Cup. It used this name until 1992 when it became known as the Coca-Cola Cup. It was sponsored by the drinks manufacturer until 1996, when it was replaced by the Rothmans Cup which was changed back to the Coca-Cola Cup in 2001 due to the new rules regarding tobacco sponsorship in sport. Telkom  became the new sponsors in 2006.

In all matches there had to be a winner on the day, this will be decided if there is a winner after full-time (90 minutes). If teams are tied at full-time then extra time will be played, penalties will decide the winner if the scores are still even (there is no golden goal rule).

The winner received R4 million.

The 2020/21 edition was cancelled after the loss of the main sponsor, and it August 2021 it was confirmed that the tournament would no longer be held, citing fixture congestion.

Competition history

Results by team

References

External links
Telkom Knockout Cup official website
Premier Soccer League
South African Football Association
RSSSF competition history

 
South
Soccer cup competitions in South Africa
Recurring sporting events established in 1982
1982 establishments in South Africa